Imageworks may refer to:

 Sony Pictures Imageworks, a visual effects and character animation company headquartered in Vancouver, British Columbia, Canada
 Image Works, a video game publisher in the late-1980s and early-1990s
 ImageWorks (Disney), an interactive area at Epcot's Imagination! pavilion
 Baltimore Productions / Imageworks, a 1980s music industry promotion company
 The Image Works, a stock photography company headquartered in Woodstock, New York, USA